Arthur Albert Brandau (June 23, 1922 – January 8, 2001) was an American football lineman who played two seasons with the Pittsburgh Steelers of the National Football League (NFL). He was drafted by the Pittsburgh Steelers in the tenth round of the 1945 NFL Draft. He played college football at the University of Tennessee and attended Baltimore City College in Baltimore, Maryland.

References

External links
 Just Sports Stats

1922 births
2001 deaths
American football centers
American football guards
Pittsburgh Steelers players
Tennessee Volunteers football players
Third Air Force Gremlins football players
Players of American football from Baltimore
Baltimore City College alumni